Jack Loughnan  (4 August 1889 – 19 November 1949) was an Australian rules footballer who played with Carlton and Fitzroy in the Victorian Football League (VFL).

Family
The son of John Loughnan, and Margaret Loughnan (c.1865-1923), née Curran, John Loughnan was born at Charlton, Victoria on 4 August 1889.

He married Agnes Beatrice Dare (1898-1965) in Christchurch, Hampshire, in England, in December 1917.

Education
He was educated at Xavier College in Kew, Victoria.

Death
He died at East Brighton on 19 November 1949.

Notes

References 
 
 World War One Embarkation Roll: Lieutenant John Loughnan, collection of the Australian War Memorial.
 World War One Nominal Roll: Captain John Loughnan MC, collection of the Australian War Memorial.
 "LOUGHNAN John (Captain): Service Number - NA: Unit - 58th Battalion, Australian Military Forces: Date of Court Martial - 2 July 1917", National Archives of Australia.
 World War One Service Record: Captain John Loughnan, National Archives of Australia.
 Photograph (DAOF050), in the collection of the Australian War Memorial.
 World War Two Nominal Roll: Captain John Loughnan (V20007), Department of Veterans' Affairs.
 B884, V20007: World War Two Service Record: Captain John Loughnan (V20007), National Archives of Australia.

External links 

Jack Loughnan's profile at Blueseum

1889 births
1949 deaths
People educated at Xavier College
Australian rules footballers from Victoria (Australia)
Carlton Football Club players
Fitzroy Football Club players
Recipients of the Military Cross
Military personnel from Victoria (Australia)